Kathy Cornelius (née McKinnon, born October 27, 1932) is an American professional golfer.

Born in Boston, Massachusetts, Cornelius attended Florida Southern College, where she played on the men's golf team, as the school did not have a women's team at the time. She turned pro in 1953 and married golf pro Bill Cornelius the same year. She joined the LPGA Tour in 1956 and won two events in her rookie season, including the U.S. Women's Open, which was to be her only major championship. She won six LPGA Tour titles in total and had her highest money list finish in 1973, when she came eighth. She made the top-20 of the money list twelve times in total (1957–65 and 1971–73).

In 1985, Kathy and her husband founded Magique Golf, a golf club company based in Arizona, which they ran until 1999. She later taught golf part-time at Rio Salado Golf Course in Tempe, Arizona. Her daughter, Kay, won the 1981 U.S. Girls' Junior, making them the only mother-daughter pair to win USGA championships.

Professional wins (8)

LPGA Tour wins (6)
1956 (2) St. Petersburg Open, U.S. Women's Open
1959 (1) Cosmopolitan Open
1961 (1) Tippecanoe Open
1972 (1) Bluegrass Invitational
1973 (1) Sealy-Faberge Classic

Other wins (2)
1956 Hot Springs 4-Ball Invitational (with Beverly Hanson)
1962 Babe Zaharias Open (tie with Betsy Rawls)

Major championships

Wins (1)

1 In an 18-hole playoff, Cornelius 75, McIntire 82.

References

External links

American female golfers
LPGA Tour golfers
Winners of LPGA major golf championships
Golfers from Massachusetts
Golfers from Arizona
Sportspeople from Boston
1932 births
Living people
21st-century American women